Wygoda  is a village in the administrative district of Gmina Ujazd, within Tomaszów Mazowiecki County, Łódź Voivodeship, in central Poland.

References

Villages in Tomaszów Mazowiecki County